The 10th Grand Prix de l'Albigeois was a Formula One motor race held on 29 August 1948 at Les Planques circuit in Albi in the Tarn department of France. The race was held over two heats of 17 laps, with the winner being decided by aggregate time. 

The winner was Luigi Villoresi in a Maserati 4CLT/48; he also set fastest qualifying time, set fastest lap and won both heats by a comfortable margin. His aggregate time was over 1 minute and 40 seconds ahead of second placed Philippe Étancelin in a Talbot-Lago T26C. Louis Rosier was third in another T26C.

Results

Qualifying

Aggregate Result

References

Albi Grand Prix
1948 in French motorsport
Motorsport in France